Mampikony urban municipality in northern Madagascar. It belongs to the district of Mampikony, which is a part of Sofia Region. The population of the municipality was 28,593 in 2018.

Mampikony is located at the Route nationale 6 and served by the local Mampikony Airport. The town provides access to hospital services to its citizens.

Geography
It is situated at 84 km  from Ambondromamy on the Route nationale 6.

Religion
 FJKM - Fiangonan'i Jesoa Kristy eto Madagasikara (Church of Jesus Christ in Madagascar)
 FLM - Fiangonana Loterana Malagasy (Malagasy Lutheran Church)
 Roman Catholic  church
 Adventist - (Adventist Church of Madagascar)
 Fiangonana APOKALIPSY (Apokalipsic Church)

Economy
Cotton and tobacco plantations.
The majority 75% of the population of the commune are farmers, while an additional 10% receives their livelihood from raising livestock. The most important crops are rice and onions; also cassava is an important agricultural product. Services provide employment for 15% of the population.

A thermic central of Jirama is localized in this town.

Protected areas
The Bongolava Forest Corridor that covers the area between Port Bergé and Mampikony.

References and notes 

Populated places in Sofia Region
Tobacco in Madagascar